Draupadi an Indian television mythological series ran for two years from 2001 to 2002 on Sahara One. It was produced by Vijay Kashyap and directed by Surendra Mohan. The music was composed by Talat Aziz and Jaspinder Narula sang the title song. The serial is based on the Odia novel Yajnaseni by Pratibha Ray.

Cast 

 Mrinal Kulkarni as Draupadi
 Rahul Bhat as Krishna
 Rajesh Shringarpure as Arjuna
 Arup Pal as Yudhishthira
 Vindu Dara Singh as Bheema
 Shahbaz Khan as Karna
 Sudhir Mittoo as Jayadratha
 Pankaj Dheer as Bheeshma
 Deepak Jethi as Duryodhana
 Kaushal Kapoor as Dushasana
 Ravi Jhankal as Shakuni
 Qasim Ali as Dhrishtadhyumna
 Parikshit Sahni as Drupada
 Mahendra Sandhu as Dronacharya
 Usha Bachani as Hidimba
 Neha Sharad as Rukmini
 Mona Parekh as Saibhya
 Sharmilee Raj as Subhadra
 Maya Alagh as Kunti
 Jyoti Joshi as Vrushali
 Pankaj Kalra as Kashiraj
 Narendra Sachar
 Anu Kashyap
 Sandesh Nayak
 Anwar Khan
 Raj Hussain
 Ashok Punjabi
 Priyanka Srivastav
 Upma Srivastav
 Vishnu Sharma as Dhritarashtra
 Vijay Kashyap
 Ahmed Khan
 Somesh Agarwal
 Nayan Bhatt as Satyavati
 Amita Nangia
 Anil Kochar
 Sonia Rakkar
 Akruti Mistry
 Sona Batra
 Madhu Bharti
 Rahul Bose
 Asha Bachani
 Bharat Arora
 Priyanka Singh
 Ramesh Goyal
 Sajid Shah
 Sunil Raj
 Dilip Mehra
 Vindu Sharma
 Prashant Jaiswal
 Sumeet Mittal
 Neeraj Sood
 Tripti Agarwal
 Pradeep Shukla
 Chandrakant Thakkar
 Sujata Thakkar
 Veena Kapoor as Devaki
 Jeetendra Shrimali

See also
 Mahabharat (1988 TV series)

References

External links
 

Television series based on Mahabharata
Sahara One original programming
2001 Indian television series debuts
2002 Indian television series endings